Tjay may refer to:

Ancient Egypt
An alias for Ramsesnakht, an overseer of a harim within Ancient Egypt 
Ramessesnakht, both individuals dated to a similar reign, 19th and 20th Dynasty)
The name of a scribe active in ancient Egypt

Music
Another name for the musician French Montana - not to be confused with Tjay (848)
Lil Tjay (born 2001), American rapper

See also
TJ (disambiguation)
Tee Jay (1962–2006), Ghanaian-British boxer
Tejay (disambiguation)